The United Nigeria People's Party was a political party in Nigeria formed and led by Chief Donald Etiebet during General Sani Abacha's military era.

At the 12 April 2003 legislative elections the party won 2.8% of popular vote, 2 out of 360 seats in the House of Representatives of Nigeria, and no seats in the Senate.

Defunct political parties in Nigeria
Political parties established in 1998